Sky Resort is a ski resort located near Ulaanbaatar, Mongolia.

Ownership and location
It is owned and operated as a joint venture by MCS Group with Petrovis, Skytel company and Kerry group, and is located on  Bogd Khan Uul. The resort is a year-round recreation destination and offers a wide range of outdoor activities. A golf course was preliminary opened in summer 2012 and set to be fully operational in 2013. Ski season is usually open from November to March or April depending on weather conditions. Night skiing as well as different package tours are also offered.

The closest airport is Buyant-Ukhaa International Airport.

Mountain statistics

Trails

 Skiable area: 
 9 trails (including ski school and sledding slope)
novice - 44%
intermediate - 22%
advanced and expert - 11%
 Longest trail -

Lifts

7 Total
 2 Quad Chairs
 2 Surface Lifts
 3 moving carpets
Uphill Capacity -  skiers per hour

References

External links
Sky Resort

Ulaanbaatar
Tourist attractions in Mongolia
Ski areas and resorts in Mongolia